Nuyorican is a portmanteau of the terms "New York" and "Puerto Rican" and refers to the members or culture of the Puerto Ricans located in or around New York City, or of their descendants (especially those raised or currently living in the New York metropolitan area). This term is sometimes used for Puerto Ricans living in other areas in the Northeastern US Mainland outside New York State as well. The term is also used by Islander Puerto Ricans (Puerto Ricans from Puerto Rico) to differentiate those of Puerto Rican descent from the Puerto Rico-born.

The term Nuyorican is also sometimes used to refer to the Spanish spoken by New York Puerto Ricans. An estimated 1,800,000 Nuyoricans are said to live in New York City, the largest Puerto Rican community outside Puerto Rico. Nuyoricans are not considered Puerto Ricans by some island Puerto Ricans due to cultural differences, which remains a point of controversy among both groups of Puerto Ricans.  Nuyorican has a broad meaning; originally it meant Puerto Ricans, both island-born and mainland-born, living in New York, but many island-born Puerto Ricans use the term to describe assimilated Americans of Puerto Rican descent, living in any US state, or very assimilated or "Afro-Americanized" people of Puerto Rican ancestry, who largely lost touch with traditional Puerto Rican culture, and grew up culturally Afro-American, though still identify with Puerto Rico. Ethnic enclaves  centered on Puerto Ricans include Spanish Harlem, Manhattan; Williamsburg, Brooklyn; Bushwick, Brooklyn; and the South Bronx.

Although Florida has received some dispersal of the population, there has been a resurgence in Puerto Rican migration to New York and New Jersey, primarily for economic and cultural considerations, topped by another surge of arrivals after Hurricane Maria devastated Puerto Rico in September 2017 – consequently, the New York City metropolitan area has witnessed a significant increase in its Nuyorican population, individuals in the region of Puerto Rican descent, increasing from 1,177,430 in 2010 to a Census-estimated 1,494,670 in 2016, maintaining New York's status by a significant margin as the most important cultural and demographic center for Puerto Ricans outside San Juan.

Etymology 
The Oxford English Dictionary cites this word as evolving slowly through roughly the last third of the 20th century, with the first cited reference being poet Jaime Carrero using neorriqueño in 1964 as a Spanish-language adjective combining neoyorquino and puertorriqueño. Many other variants developed along the way, including neoricano, neorican (also written as Neo-Rican and Neorican), and newyorican (also written as New Yorrican). Nuyorican itself dates at least from 1975, the date of the first public sessions of the Nuyorican Poets Café. Some of the best known "Nuyoricans" who have written and performed their experiences of being a Puerto Rican in New York are: Miguel Piñero, Miguel Algarín, Piri Thomas, Sandra María Esteves, Willie Colón, Pedro Pietri, and Giannina Braschi.  Some of the newer poets include Willie Perdomo, Flaco Navaja, Nancy Mercado, Emanuel Xavier, Edwin Torres, J.L. Torres, Caridad de la Luz aka La Bruja, Lemon Andersen, and Bonafide Rojas.

Historically, the term has been used as a derogatory term by native Puerto Ricans when describing a person that has Puerto Rican ancestry but is born outside of Puerto Rico. It also can sometimes include those born in Puerto Rico who now live elsewhere in the United States (other than New York). This changed from the original meaning with the increase in travel back and forth to different parts of the United States and the globe. The definition includes those born in New York who have moved to Puerto Rico as well.

The term is used by some members of this community to identify their history and cultural affiliation to a common ancestry while being separated from the island, both physically and through language and cultural shifts. This distance created a dual identity that, while still somewhat identifying with the island, recognizes the influences both geography and cultural assimilation have had. Puerto Ricans in other cities have coined similar terms, including "Philly Rican" for Puerto Ricans in Philadelphia, and "Chi-Town Rican" for Puerto Ricans in Chicago.

History 
Many Nuyoricans are second- and third-generation Puerto Rican Americans whose parents or grandparents arrived in the New York metropolitan area during the Gran Migración (Great Migration). Puerto Ricans began to arrive in New York City in the nineteenth century but especially following the passage of the Jones-Shafroth Act on March 2, 1917, which granted U.S. citizenship to virtually all Puerto Ricans. The Gran Migración accelerated migration from Puerto Rico to New York during the 1940s and 1950s, but such large-scale emigration began to slow by the late 1960s.

In 2000, the Puerto Rican population of New York was over 1,050,000. As of the 2010 census, Puerto Ricans represented 8.9 percent of New York City alone (32% of the city's Hispanic community), and 5.5% of New York State as a whole. Of over a million Puerto Ricans in the state, about 70% are present in New York City, with the remaining portion spreading increasingly within the city's suburbs and other major cities throughout New York State. Although Florida has received some dispersal of the population, there has been a resurgence in Puerto Rican migration to New York and New Jersey, primarily for economic and cultural considerations, topped by another surge of arrivals after Hurricane Maria devastated Puerto Rico in September 2017 – consequently, the New York City Metropolitan Area has witnessed a significant increase in its Nuyorican population, individuals in the region of Puerto Rican descent, increasing from 1,177,430 in 2010 to a Census-estimated 1,494,670 in 2016.

Historically, Nuyoricans resided in the predominantly Hispanic/Latino section of Upper Manhattan known as Spanish Harlem, and around the Loisaida section of the East Village, but later spread across the city into newly created Puerto Rican/Nuyorican enclaves in Brooklyn, Queens, and the South Bronx. Today, there are fewer island-born Puerto Ricans than mainland-born Puerto Ricans in New York City.

Prominent figures of the Nuyorican movement include poets and novelists Piri Thomas and Giannina Braschi, while Miguel Algarín, Miguel Piñero, and Pedro Pietri co-founded the Nuyorican Poets Café, a performance space for Nuyorican poets and musicians.

Notable Nuyoricans 

Nuyoricans have made breakthrough contributions in government, science, law, culture, and the humanities, including those who have broken records, significantly impacted U.S. pop culture, won landmark cases that changed laws, or have been recognized by national awards.
 Eugenio Alvarez – Late U.S. representative from New York State.
 Carmelo Anthony – Basketball player
 Marc Anthony – Record holder in the Guinness World Record for best-selling salsa artist and the most number-one albums on the Billboard Tropical Albums charts.
 Amanda Ayala - Singer/Songwriter
 Herman Badillo – Late U.S. representative from New York State
 Jean-Michel Basquiat – Artist, whose painting Untitled (1982) sold for $110.5 million in 2017, a new record high for an American artist at auction. 
 Giannina Braschi – Writer, a National Endowment for the Arts Literature Fellow, published the first Spanglish novel Yo-Yo Boing!
 Miguel Braschi – Attorney, won the landmark legal case Braschi v. Stahl Associates Co. in the New York State Court of Appeals, which marked the first time state law recognized a gay couple as a family.
 Irene Cara – Actress and singer
 John Carro – was the first Nuyorican to be named a judge on the NY State Supreme Court, Appellate Division.
 Luis Ferré-Sadurní is a journalist with The New York Times.
 Willie Colon performing artist, musician, producer, composer, arranger
 Robert Garcia – late U.S. representative from New York State
 Daniel Hernandez – Rapper
 Kayel – Latin freestyle singer and frontman for TKA
 La India – Freestyle and Sals singer
 J.I the Prince of New York – rapper
 George Lamond – Freestyle singer
 Lisa Lisa (Lisa Velez) – Freestyle singer
 Jennifer Lopez – performing artist, entrepreneur, and founder of Nuyorican Productions, made Forbes list of most powerful entertainers, with annual earnings in excess of US$52 million.
 Lynda Lopez – journalist and author
 Sonia Manzano – actress, screenwriter, author, singer and songwriter.
 Margarita López – first openly lesbian councilwoman and female Puerto Rican elected to the New York City Council, serving from 1998 through 2006
 Melissa Mark-Viverito – Speaker of the New York City Council from 2014 through 2017
 Angie Martinez – Rapper and radio host
 Lisette Melendez – Freestyle singer
 Rosie Méndez – former member of the New York City Council (2006-2018)
 Lin-Manuel Miranda, creator of the Broadway musical Hamilton, won the Pulitzer Prize in Drama.
 Nicholasa Mohr – Author
 Richie Narvaez – Author
 Alexandria Ocasio-Cortez – politician who serves as the U.S. representative from New York's 14th congressional district.
 Antonio Pagán – late and first openly gay male and Puerto Rican elected to the New York City Council, serving from 1994 through 1998; former New York City Commissioner of Small Businesses (1998-2002)
 Noel Pagán – Freestyle singer
 Rosie Perez – Actress and choreographer 
 Damian Priest – professional wrestler 
 Tito Puente – musician, songwriter, bandleader, and record producer
 Princess Nokia – rapper
 Charles Rangel – former U.S. representative from New York
 Sylvia Rivera – Late LGBT rights activist
 Mj Rodriguez – Actress
 David Rosado – former U.S. representative from New York
 Sa-Fire (Wilma Cosmé) – Latin freestyle singer
 José E. Serrano – former U.S. representative, serving multiple districts in New York State
 Sonia Sotomayor – the first Nuyorican lawyer to become a United States Supreme Court Justice.
 Cynthia Torres – Freestyle singer
 Edwin Torres – New York State Supreme Court judge and author of Carlito's Way
 TKA – Freestyle band
 Judy Torres – Latin freestyle singer and radio host
 Ritchie Torres – U.S. representative for New York's 15th congressional district
 Neil deGrasse Tyson – astrophysicist and television host of the PBS series Cosmos: A Spacetime Odyssey and Cosmos: Possible Worlds. He is the first person of Puerto Rican descent to be Director of the Hayden Planetarium in New York City.

See also

African Americans
Bushwick, Brooklyn
Cultural assimilation
New York Latino English
New York City ethnic enclaves
Nuyorican Movement
Nuyorican Poets Café
Puerto Ricans in New York City
Puerto Ricans in the United States
Racial inequality in the United States
Sunset Park, Brooklyn
Teatro Puerto Rico

References

External links
 Sofrito For Your Soul Online Magazine
 Capicu Poetry & Cultural Showcase
 Celebrities Desde Nueva York
 The art of Santiago
 Association of Hispanic Arts (AHA)
 Nuyorican cinema
 Boricuation Cultural Foundation
 Soraida Martinez, New York born artist of Puerto Rican heritage known as creator of Verdadism
 "Nuyorican Power"

Hispanic and Latino American culture in New York City
Puerto Rican culture in New York (state)
Puerto Rican culture in New York City